Adhikari is a 1991 Tamil-language action film directed by P. Vasu. The film stars C. Arunpandian and Gautami, with Anand, Goundamani, Senthil, Sethu Vinayagam, Srividya, Anju, Rocky, Rajeshkumar, Choudary and Abhilasha playing supporting roles. It was released on 14 April 1991. The film is a remake of P. Vasu's own 1986 Kannada film Guri.

Plot

Duraipandi escapes from jail to take revenge on the gold smuggler Varadappan. Varadappan tried many ways to kill Duraipandi in jail, but his henchmen failed each time. Pursued by the police, the fugitive Duraipandi lands in a remote village where a woman named Ponni helps him hide. There, he meets his former colleague Anbu, surprised by Duraipandi, Anbu runs away and dies by getting hit by a car. Anbu is none other than Ponni's brother. After the funeral, Duraipandi tells Ponni the reason of his desire for revenge on Varadappan.

In the past, Duraipandi was a sincere and fearless custom officer. He lived happily with his mother and his sister Seetha. One day, Duraipandi seized a cargo full of illegal gold bars belonging to Varadappan. In the meantime, Seetha got engaged with the police inspector Sarath. Everything went well until Varadappan planned to send Duraipandi behind bars. Under the orders of Varadappan, Duraipandi's co-workers Mary, Rocky, Raghu, and Anbu betrayed Duraipandi, and Duraipandi was sent to jail by Sarath for trying to rape Mary. Seetha's wedding was cancelled; thus Seetha committed suicide and Duraipandi's mother became mentally ill.

Duraipandi knows that Mary was killed by Varadappan and the only information he had was Anbu's location. Duraipandi and Ponni fall in love with each other and start to live together. Later, Rocky is blackmailed by Varadappan, so Rocky tries to murder Duraipandi. During the fight, however, Rocky accidentally falls off a mountain cliff and dies. Duraipandi decides to take care of Rocky's baby son. Afterwards, Raghu gets killed by Varadappan's henchmen.

Duraipandi is still in pursuit of Varadappan to kill him, whereas the police want to capture the fugitive Duraipandi. What transpires later forms the crux of the story.

Cast

C. Arunpandian as Duraipandi
Gautami as Ponni
Anand as Sarath
Goundamani
Senthil
Sethu Vinayagam as Varadappan
Srividya as Duraipandi's mother
Anju as Seetha
Rocky as Rocky
Rajeshkumar as Raghu
Choudary as Anbu
Abhilasha as Mary
Poornam Viswanathan as Raghu's father
Typist Gopu
Kalaiselvi
Keerthy
Thilak
Rajmadhan as Doctor
Master Gowtham Vishnu as Rocky's son
Vijayakumar as Inspector Vijayakumar (guest appearance)
Manjula Vijayakumar as Doctor Manjula (guest appearance)
Prabhu Deva in a special appearance

Soundtrack

The film score and the soundtrack were composed by Gangai Amaran. The soundtrack, released in 1991, features 5 tracks with lyrics written by Vaali.

References

External links

1991 films
1990s Tamil-language films
Indian action films
Films scored by Gangai Amaran
Films directed by P. Vasu
Tamil remakes of Kannada films
1991 action films